E-ACT Royton and Crompton Academy is a coeducational, secondary academy school for 11- to 16-year-olds in the Metropolitan Borough of Oldham, Greater Manchester, England.

History
The school was formerly called Royton and Crompton School. In this incarnation it was judged Inadequate by Ofsted in 2017. The school became an academy as part of E-ACT in 2018. As of 2019, the headteacher is Andrea Atkinson. The previous headteacher before Andrea Atkinson was Neil Hutchinson who was the head teacher from September 2016 to December 2018

References

External links
 School website

Secondary schools in the Metropolitan Borough of Oldham
Educational institutions established in 1968
Academies in the Metropolitan Borough of Oldham